is a Japanese manga created by Go Nagai. It is loosely based on the Shinto deity Susanoo.

With this manga, Nagai won the Kodansha Manga Award in the Shōnen category. The original serialization of Kodansha was suspended in 1981, but the success of the novels written by Yasutaka Nagai, prompted Kadokawa Shoten to request Go to resume his work on Susano Oh. With this, the manga would be published for a period of ten years, from 1979 to 1989. Even so, the manga was left with an open ending for a possible next part.

An RPG video game adaption titled  was released in Japan by Hudson on April 27, 1989 on the PC Engine. A board game based on the series called Dreadful Susano Oh King Go Nagai was released by a company called Epoch.

Plot
Highschool freshman Shingo Susa follows his childhood friend and crush Sayuri Yukishiro to their school's ESP club, whose members attempt to research psychic powers. However, they later discover there are two real psychics in the school: Chigusa Mitsurugi, the beautiful president of the club, and Rei Uryu, a resident prodigy who opposes Chigusa and offers to enhance the psychic potential of anybody who follows him. Uryu tries to recruit Susa, whom he knows to have an immense power latent, in order to help him fight for justice, but Susa declines out of loyalty for Chigusa.

Eventually Shingo and Sayuri become a couple, but a savage gang of delinquents attack them and rape her. The trauma blows up Shingo's bottled psychic potential and creates a violent, powerful alternate personality bent on getting revenge. Now as a changed person, and having lost track of Sayuri, Shingo fights through yakuza, thugs and his school's corrupt club alliance until discovering that the attack was ordered by a sinister organization named Nosferatu. The latter plans for world domination and has its own team of psychics, led by a mysterious woman named Carmilla, who has influence over the club federation. Shingo leads a school revolution against them, helped by Chigusa, boxing club leader Goda, kendo genius Tatsuya Mido and other students, and eventually overthrows their regime.

It is then revealed that Carmilla is actually a disguised Uryu and that Sayuri worked for him all along. Uryu staged the entire plot in order to liberate Shingo's powers and use him, as an incarnation of the legendary Susanoo, to destroy human civilization, so he could rebuild the world with only psychic humans. However, his plan is too successful, as Shingo loses control of his powers: a part of his soul leaves his body, hijacks a coming star, and becomes a prophesied apocalyptic monster, the Yamata no Orochi. His influence causes demons from other dimensions to start sliding into the world, possessing humans and provoking disasters, while Shingo's body lies apparently dead.

Chigusa reveals herself as the heir of an ancient clan of descendants of Atlantis, as well as the incarnation of ancient goddess Marici, and commands an Atlantean space force formed by clones of her in an attempt to destroy Yamata no Orochi. Shingo's family is also revealed to know the prophecy regarding him, and they join the Atlanteans in their fight. At the same time, Sayuri (who really fell in love with Shingo despite her duplicity) convinces Uryu to try to redeem Shingo by playing the roles of Ame no Uzume and Ame no Tajikarao, respectively. The story of the manga ends in midst of the climax.

In an additional epilogue in the manga's 1996 revised re-edition, Chigusa manages to neutralize the Yamata no Orochi in a secret Atlantean outpost in the Face of Mars. In an Earth ravaged and in a postapocalyptic state, Uryu and Sayuri come out of their refuge and look for Shingo, while Goda has overcome the possession of a demon and is now hunting other monsters. Shingo then comes alive again under the form of Susanoo, apparently now in full control of his powers, and walks past Goda before stopping in front of Uryu and Sayuri. The outcome of their encounter is not revealed.

Media

Manga

Susano Oh
Kodansha (KC Magazine, 1980–1981)

Kodansha (KC Phoenix 10, 1996)

Kodansha (Kodansha Manga Bunko, 2000–2001)

Fukkan.com (Kanzen Hatsude Shūkan Shōnen Magajin-ban, 2021–2022)

001 Edizioni (Hikari Edizioni, 2022–present)
This edition is an Italian language translation for the European market.

Susano Oh Densetsu (Manga Version)
Kadokawa (Kadokawa Shoten Yamato Comics Special, 1985-1990)
First five volumes of this edition are a reprint of the original Weekly Shōnen Magazine serialization. Volumes six and seven contain Susano Oh Densetsu Hi Kami Ko, Shin Susano Oh, Susano Oh Densetsu Yami no Majin Hen, and Susano Oh Densetsu Gaiden.

Novels

Susano Oh Densetsu (Novel Version)
Kadokawa (Kadokawa Novels, 1982-1987)

Kadokawa (Kadokawa Library, 1988-1990)

References

External links
Susano Oh  at The World of Go Nagai webpage.
Susano Oh Densetsu (novel)  at The World of Go Nagai webpage.
Susanoo  at D/visual.
Susanoo  at Gonagainet.

1979 manga
1985 manga
1987 manga
1989 manga
Go Nagai
Kadokawa Dwango franchises
Kadokawa Shoten manga
Kodansha manga
Nihon Bungeisha manga
Shōnen manga
Winner of Kodansha Manga Award (Shōnen)